Matt Williamson  is an American football coach and former player. He is currently the head football coach at Missouri Western State University in Saint Joseph, Missouri, a position he has held since the 2017 season. After playing four years at Missouri Western, Williams served as the team's graduate assistant for the 1998 season. In 1999, Williamson left for a year at Arkansas–Monticello before returning to Missouri Western where he served in various roles as a defensive coach from 2000 to 2006. In 2007, Williamson left for Central Arkansas to become the defensive coordinator for three seasons, before heading to Stephen F. Austin to become their defensive coordinator. In December 2016, Williamson was named the sixth head coach at Missouri Western. Williamson was relieved of his duties at Missouri Western the day after the last game of the 2022 season. He compiled a record of 31–28 as the head coach for the Griffons.

Head coaching record

References

External links
 Missouri Western profile

Year of birth missing (living people)
Living people
American football defensive linemen
Missouri Western Griffons football coaches
Missouri Western Griffons football players
Arkansas–Monticello Boll Weevils football coaches
Central Arkansas Bears football coaches
Stephen F. Austin Lumberjacks football coaches
Coaches of American football from Missouri
Players of American football from St. Louis